California's 11th State Assembly district is one of 80 California State Assembly districts. It is currently represented by Democrat Lori Wilson of Suisun City.

District profile 
The district is centered on the Sacramento–San Joaquin River Delta. It includes the far northeastern corner of the San Francisco Bay Area and the southwestern corner of the Sacramento Valley. The Sacramento and San Joaquin rivers converge here, and a significant part of the district is low-lying and/or reclaimed.

Contra Costa County – 21.5%
 Antioch
 Brentwood
 Discovery Bay
 Oakley
 Pittsburg – 22.2%

Sacramento County – 0.3%
 Isleton
 Walnut Grove

Solano County – 57.4%
 Collinsville
 Fairfield
 Rio Vista
 Suisun City
 Vacaville

Election results from statewide races

List of Assembly Members 
Due to redistricting, the 11th district has been moved around different parts of the state. The current iteration resulted from the 2011 redistricting by the California Citizens Redistricting Commission.

Election results 1992 - present

2020

2018

2016

2014

2012

2010

2008

2006

2004

2002

2000

1998

1996

1994

1992

See also 
 California State Assembly
 California State Assembly districts
 Districts in California

References

External links 
 District map from the California Citizens Redistricting Commission

11
Government of Contra Costa County, California
Government of Sacramento County, California
Government of Solano County, California
Antioch, California
Brentwood, California
Pittsburg, California
Fairfield, California
Vacaville, California